Jacob J. Sawyer (1856–1885) was an American composer, pianist, songwriter, and conductor. His Welcome to the Era March (1877) was included in James Monroe Trotter's Music and Some Highly Musical People (1878).

Life and career
Jacob J. Sawyer was born in Boston on 5 November 1856. He toured  with different groups, such as the Hyers Sisters, the Louisiana Jubilee Singers, and Haverly's Colored Minstrels. After a 5-month tour to England with the Haverly's Colored Minstrels, Sawyer returned to Boston in late 1881, where he started working at a local bank. He later performed with the Virginia Jubilee Singers, the Sam Lucas Jubilee Songsters, the Maryland Jubilee Singers and the Slayton Ideal Company. In 1884, he became the musical director of the Nashville Students. He died from tuberculosis on 3 June 1885.

Works
 Sawyer, Jacob J. Out of Bondage Waltz for piano [op. 2], Cincinnati 1879.
 Sawyer, Jacob J. Seventh Exposition Grand March for piano [op. 3], Cincinnati 1879.
 Sawyer, Jacob J. All the Rage (Grand March) for piano, Boston 1880.
 Sawyer, Jacob J. Up in a Corner (Schottisch) for piano, Philadelphia 1881.
 Sawyer, Jacob J. Return of Spring (Polka) for piano, New York 1882.
 Sawyer, Jacob J. The Bijou March for piano, New York 1882.
 Sawyer, Jacob J. Etta Polka for piano, New York 1882.
 Sawyer, Jacob J. Jersey Lily Waltzes for piano, Boston 1882.
 Sawyer, Jacob J. Little Sweetheart (Schottische) for piano, New York 1882.
 Sawyer, Jacob J. Lotta Schottisch for piano, Boston 1882.
 Sawyer, Jacob J. Old "49" Schottische for piano, New York 1882.
 Sawyer, Jacob J. Rosebud (Gavotte) for piano, New York 1882.
 Sawyer, Jacob J. Cambridge Pretty Girls for piano, New York 1882.
 Sawyer, Jacob J. Bob-o-link (Mazurka) for piano, Chicago 1883.
 Sawyer, Jacob J. The Rankins' March for piano, Detroit 1883.
 Sawyer, Jacob J. Passion Flower Waltzes for piano, Detroit 1884.
 Sawyer, Jacob J. Bicycle Waltzes for piano, New York 1885.
 Jubilee Songs and Plantation Melodies, arr. by Jacob J. Sawyer. Chicago, IL: H. B. Thearle, 1884.

References

Sources

External links

 YouTube Playlist with music by Jacob J. Sawyer

1856 births
1885 deaths
19th-century American composers
19th-century classical composers
19th-century classical pianists
19th-century American male musicians
African-American classical composers
American classical composers
African-American male classical composers
American male classical composers
Male classical pianists